Archaeophis is an extinct genus of snake from the Eocene of Monte Bolca.

References
 Recent Vertebrate Carcasses and Their Paleobiological Implications by Johannes Weigelt and Judith Schaefer (page 88)

Eocene snakes
Fossils of Italy
Fossil taxa described in 1859